Artis Historicae Penus (Treasury of the Art of History, 1579) is a compilation of 18 ars historica works brought out in 1579 by the late Renaissance Basel printer Pietro Perna. This compendium in octavo appeared in 2 volumes with a copious index. A third volume adds the final work by Antonio Riccoboni, often missing in library collections as a separate edition. Three years earlier, in 1576, Perna brought out a single volume in the same format that ran to 1140 pages and featured the central work of Jean Bodin in its title, along with twelve other authors. Perna writes a letter to the lover of histories (Historiarum amatori Typographus). Editor Johann Wolf dedicates the second collection to Frederick I of Wurttemberg. He states that he has included all the princely dedications and prefaces of the single works from the source editions for the sake of completeness.
 
In addition to the two standard Greek texts of the ars historica translated into Latin, the authors, editors and translators are an international list of the most notable  humanist writers on history of the period. There are several Catholics, but those closest to the Perna press were Protestants.  Among them are six Italians, four Germans, three Frenchmen, a Spaniard and a Hungarian. As humanist members of the Renaissance Res Publica Litterarum all wrote in Latin, though Stupano translated Patrizi's Dieci Dialoghi for Perna. The dates of the editions used by Perna follow the authors' names.
I.      Jean Bodin 1572,
II.     Francesco Patrizi (trans. Johann Nikolaus Stupano) 1570,
III.    Giovanni Pontano 1556,
IV.     Francois Baudouin 1561,
V.      Sebastian Fox Morcillo 1557,
VI.     Giovanni Antonio Viperani 1567,
VII.    Francis Robortello 1560,
VIII.   Dionysius of Halicarnassus (trans. Andreas Dudith) 1560,
IX.     Christopher Milieu 1551,
X.       1574,
XI.     David Chytraeus 1569,
XII.    Lucian of Samosata (trans. Jacob Micyllus) 1538,
XIII.   Simon Grynaeus 1539,
XIV.    Celio Secondo Curione 1554,
XV.     Christopher Pezel 1568,
XVI.    Theodor Zwinger 1571,
XVII.   Johannes Sambucus 1568,
XVIII.  Antonio Riccoboni 1568.

The ars historica and its classical exempla were important pedagogical tools for the education of princes, treasured for the lessons in statecraft found in histories. They also served as an antidote to the influence of Niccolò Machiavelli.     
The Counter Reformation polyhistor Antonio Possevino fathered a Jesuit ars historica to replace the influence of Bodin and the heterodox authors of the Perna collection in his Bibliotheca selecta 1593 and expanded it to an Apparatus ad omnium gentium historiam 1597.

References
Artis Historicae Penus Octodecim scriptorum tam veterum quam recentiorum monumentis & inter eos Io. praepicue Bodini Methodi historicae sex instructa. Basileae: Ex officina Petri Pernae. MDLXXIX.
Io. Bodini Methodus historica duodecim eiusdem argumenti scriptorum, tam veterum quam recentiorum, commentariis adaucta; quorum elenchum praefationi subiecimus. Basileae: Ex Petri Pernae officina. MDLXXVI.

External links

All 18 works of this edition [but Riccoboni separately] are accessible online under this title as a Google book 

Renaissance humanism
History books
Historiography